Fantastic Four is a PlayStation video game developed by Probe Entertainment and published by Acclaim Entertainment. The game was released in 1997, and is based on the Marvel Comics characters of the same name. A beat 'em up game released at a time when the genre was virtually dead, it received negative reviews which characterized it as repetitive and boringly easy.

Storyline 
Doctor Doom has developed a device that transports the Fantastic Four to various locations to do battle with various monsters and supervillains. Mr. Fantastic assembles a time machine that allows him to transport the team to Doom's tiny kingdom for a final battle. While Galactus does not appear in the game, it is clear that he is behind the destruction of the Skrull homeworld.

Gameplay 
The format of the game is similar to arcade games such as Final Fight and Acclaim's own Batman Forever: The Arcade Game. Up to four players (with a PlayStation Multitap) can control Mr. Fantastic, Invisible Woman, the Thing, Human Torch or She-Hulk through various side-scrolling levels. Groups of thugs, robots, and mutants will appear on each screen and need to be destroyed before the player can advance. Every character has various short-range fighting moves: punching, kicking, jumping, and tossing enemies or objects. In addition, each character has at least four special moves unique to that character. Using blocks or certain special moves drains the character's "Force Power".

Some enemies will leave behind icons that give the player an extra life, or restore their health or Force Power. At the end of each level, there is a supervillain to defeat: Mole Man, Super-Skrull, Attuma, Sub-Mariner, Psycho-Man, or Doctor Doom. After the defeat of the boss, without the loss of any player life, there is one of three bonus rounds. The fights here are set against Dragon Man, the Incredible Hulk, or Iceman. During the loading time between each level, the player is able to play a mini-car racing game.

The player can switch between any of the superheroes not already being played at any time. Some of the bosses speak briefly before they fight or are defeated; this is affected by the choice of player character.

If a player uses the same move too many times, a "cheesy" icon appears, while using a wide variety of moves causes a thumbs-up icon to appear. Neither icon has any impact on the player's score.

Development
A Sega Saturn version of the game was announced, but Acclaim cancelled it in early 1997.

Reception

Fantastic Four received overwhelmingly negative reviews. Both IGN and Next Generation criticized the poor control and rough sprites, and GameSpot and Next Generation both found the music completely failed to fit in with the game. Next Generation said, "Like the worst of Acclaim's licensed games for the last eight years, this one takes a venerable piece of pop-culture property, in this case Stan Lee's Fantastic 4, and reduces it to dismal side-scrolling action – using 'action' in the loosest sense of the word." In Japan, where the game was ported and published by Acclaim Japan on February 19, 1998, Famitsu gave it a score of 16 out of 40.

GamePros brief review criticized that "the character animation is stiff, the sound effects are campy, and the gameplay quickly becomes repetitive as waves of enemies attack in predictable patterns." IGN ventured that it "could very well be the worst game ever made." GameSpot had a more mixed reaction, arguing that Fantastic Four has some interesting features, such as its multiplayer capabilities, and that if the core game had been worked on so that it wasn't so boring and easy, it would have been a much better game.

Though they never reviewed the game, Electronic Gaming Monthly named Fantastic Four Worst Use of a Good License in their 1998 Video Game Buyer's Guide, commenting, "Aside from its somewhat-decent polygonal graphics, Fantastic Four is nothing more than dull, repetitive Final Fight rehash."

Notes

References

External links
 

Fantastic Four can be played for free in the browser on the Internet Archive

1997 video games
Acclaim Entertainment games
Cancelled Sega Saturn games
PlayStation (console) games
PlayStation (console)-only games
Superhero video games
Video games based on the Fantastic Four
Video games developed in the United Kingdom
Video games set in Atlantis
Video games set in Europe
Video games set in New York City